Franco Grossi (born 4 January 1939) is a retired Italian discus thrower who won a bronze medal at the 1963 Mediterranean Games. He competed at the 1960 Olympics and finished in 29th place.

References

External links
 

1939 births
Living people
Italian male discus throwers
Olympic athletes of Italy
Athletes (track and field) at the 1960 Summer Olympics
Mediterranean Games bronze medalists for Italy
Athletes (track and field) at the 1963 Mediterranean Games
Mediterranean Games medalists in athletics
20th-century Italian people